Edmond I de Bermingham, Anglo-Irish lord, born 1570, died 1645.

Edmond prospered during the economic recovery of Ireland in the early decades of the 17th century. However, he was one of dozens of Connacht landowners threatened with confiscation by Thomas Wentworth, 1st Earl of Strafford during the 1630s. Though never among the most prominent persons of the era, he was associated with the likes of Patrick D'Arcy, Sir Diarmaid Ó Seachnasaigh and Richard Martyn.

He became a member of the Confederate Ireland after the Irish Rebellion of 1641.

References

 History of Galway, James Hardiman, Galway, 1820
 The Abbey of Athenry, Martin J. Blake, Journal of the Galway Archaeological and Historical Society, volume II, part ii, 1902
 The Birmingham family of Athenry, H.T. Knox, J.G.A.H.S., volume ten, numbers iii and iv, 1916–17.
 Remarks on the walls and church of Athenry, Charles Mac Neill, J.G.A.H.S., volume 11, numbers iii and iv, 1921
 Old Galway, Maureen Donovan O'Sullivan, 1942.
 Punann Arsa:The Story of Athenry, County Galway, Martin Finnerty, Ballinasloe, 1951.
 Athenry: A Medieval Irish Town, Etienne Rynne, Athenry Historical Society, Athenry, 1992

People from County Galway
Barons Athenry
Richard III
1570 births
1645 deaths